Coronach Mountain is a  mountain summit located in Jasper National Park of Alberta, Canada. It is situated in the Bosche Range of the Canadian Rockies. The mountain was named in 1916 by Morrison P. Bridgland, who was inspired by the howling of nearby coyotes and applied the name Coronach, the Scottish Gaelic word for funeral dirge. Bridgland (1878-1948) was a Dominion Land Surveyor who named many peaks in Jasper Park and the Canadian Rockies. The mountain's name was officially adopted in 1956 by the Geographical Names Board of Canada. Its nearest higher peak is Mount Aeolus,  to the north. 


Climate

Based on the Köppen climate classification, Coronach Mountain is located in a subarctic climate with cold, snowy winters, and mild summers.

See also
 Geology of the Rocky Mountains

References

External links
 Coronach Mountain photo Flickr
 Parks Canada web site: Jasper National Park

Mountains of Jasper National Park
Canadian Rockies
Two-thousanders of Alberta